Fordice is a surname. Notable people with the surname include:

Kirk Fordice (1934–2004), American politician and businessman 
Pat Fordice (1934–2007), First Lady of Mississippi, wife of Kirk